Tina Signesdottir Hult is a Norwegian photographer.

Biography 
Tina Signesdottir Hult was born in Haugesund, Norway in 1982. She started to photograph early in the school.  She is a self-taught photographer, specializing in portraiture photography. In January 2018, she was chosen as recipient of Hasselblad Masters Award in portrait category.

Work 
Hult specializes in fine art and portrait photography.

Exhibitions 
 2017: Image Nation, DeFactory, Paris, France 
 2017: Image Nation, International Photo Expo, Galleria Civica, Desenzano del Garda, Italia
 2016: Image Nation – DeFactory – Paris, France
 2016: The Blind Pilots Project #2 – Thessaloniki, Greece
 2015: Sony World Photography Awards Exhibition – Somerset House – London, England
 2014: Solo Exhibition, Culture Night  – Haugesund, Norway
 2014: PhotoWorld Exhibition Festival, Breaking photography – New York, US
 2014: Fotografiets dag – Preus Museum – Horten, Norway
 2014: 8Th Emirates Edition (2013) “Decisive Moment” – Saadiyat Cultural District – Abu Dhabi, UAE
 2014: Solo Exhibition (NsFF), Nordic Light, International Festival of Photography – Kristiansund, Norway
 2014: Sony World Photography Awards Exhibition – Somerset House – London, England
 2014: Group Exhibition – Cyan :studio – Oslo, Norway
 2013: Group Exhibition – Cyan :studio – Oslo, Norway

Awards 
 2015. Sony World Photography Awards. Winner in National Awards Category. 
 2018. Hasselblad Masters Award. Winner in Portrait category.

References 

1982 births
Living people
Norwegian photographers
Norwegian women photographers
People from Haugesund